Wilko may refer to:

People
 Wilko Johnson (1947–2022), English musician
 Wilko de Vogt (born 1975), Dutch football goalkeeper, mostly played for Dutch clubs
 Wilko Risser (born 1982), Namibian-German football forward, mostly played for German clubs, now plays for Chippa United

Other uses
 Wilko (retailer), a British high-street chain selling homewares and household goods
 Wilko (horse), an American racehorse

See also
 Jonny Wilkinson (born 1979), English rugby player
 The Maids of Wilko, a 1979 film by Polish director Andrzej Wajda
 Wilco (disambiguation)
 Wilkos, surname